
Gmina Bojanów is a rural gmina (administrative district) in Stalowa Wola County, Subcarpathian Voivodeship, in south-eastern Poland.

Villages
Gmina Bojanów contains the villages and settlements of Bojanów, Burdze, Cisów Las, Gwoździec, Korabina, Kozły Załęże, Laski, Maziarnia, Przyszów, Ruda, Stany, and Zakrochowa.

Neighbouring gminas
Gmina Bojanów is bordered by the town of Stalowa Wola and by the gminas of Dzikowiec, Grębów, Jeżowe, Majdan Królewski, Nisko and Nowa Dęba.

References

Polish official population figures 2006

Bojanow
Stalowa Wola County